Christoph Peiker (29 December 1888 – 15 July 1924, in Tallinn) was an Estonian politician. He was a member of the Estonian Constituent Assembly.

References

1888 births
1924 deaths
Members of the Estonian Constituent Assembly